The Oersted Medal recognizes notable contributions to the teaching of physics. Established in 1936, it is awarded by the American Association of Physics Teachers. The award is named for Hans Christian Ørsted. It is the Association's most prestigious award.

Well-known recipients include Nobel laureates Robert Andrews Millikan, Edward M. Purcell, Richard Feynman, Isidor I. Rabi, Norman F. Ramsey,  Hans Bethe, and Carl Wieman; as well as Arnold Sommerfeld, George Uhlenbeck, Jerrold Zacharias, Philip Morrison, Melba Phillips, Victor Weisskopf, Gerald Holton, John A. Wheeler, Frank Oppenheimer, Robert Resnick, Carl Sagan, Freeman Dyson, Daniel Kleppner, and Lawrence Krauss, and Anthony French, David Hestenes, Robert Karplus, Robert Pohl, and Francis Sears.

The 2008 medalist, Mildred S. Dresselhaus, is the third woman to win the award in its 70-plus-year history.

Medalists

 William Suddards Franklin – 1936
 Edwin Herbert Hall – 1937
 Alexander Wilmer Duff – 1938
 Benjamin Harrison Brown – 1939
 Robert Andrews Millikan – 1940
 Henry Crew – 1941
 not awarded in 1942
 George Walter Stewart – 1943
 Roland Roy Tileston – 1944
 Homer Levi Dodge – 1945
 Ray Lee Edwards – 1946
 Duane Roller – 1947
 William Harley Barber – 1948
 Arnold Sommerfeld – 1949
 Orrin H. Smith – 1950
 John Wesley Hornbeck – 1951
 Ansel A. Knowlton – 1952
 Richard M. Sutton – 1953
 Clifford N. Wall – 1954
 Vernet E. Eaton – 1955
 George E. Uhlenbeck – 1956
 Mark W. Zemansky – 1957
 Jay William Buchta – 1958
 Paul Kirkpatrick – 1959
 Robert W. Pohl – 1960
 Jerrold R. Zacharias – 1961
 Francis W. Sears – 1962
 Francis L. Friedman – 1963
 Walter Christian Michels – 1964
 Philip Morrison – 1965
 Leonard I. Schiff – 1966
 Edward M. Purcell – 1967
 Harvey E. White – 1968
 Eric M. Rogers – 1969
 Edwin C. Kemble – 1970
 Uri Haber-Schaim – 1971
 Richard P. Feynman – 1972
 Arnold Arons – 1973
 Melba N. Phillips – 1974
 Robert Resnick – 1975
 Victor F. Weisskopf – 1976
 H. Richard Crane – 1977
 Wallace A. Hilton – 1978
 Charles Kittel – 1979
 Paul E. Klopsteg – 1979, Extraordinary Oersted Medal Award
 Gerald Holton – 1980
 Robert Karplus – 1981
 I. I. Rabi – 1982
 John A. Wheeler – 1983
 Frank Oppenheimer – 1984
 Sam Treiman – 1985
 Stanley S. Ballard – 1986
 Clifford E. Swartz – 1987
 Norman F. Ramsey – 1988
 Anthony P. French – 1989
 Carl E. Sagan – 1990
 Freeman Dyson – 1991
 Eugen Merzbacher – 1992
 Hans A. Bethe – 1993
 E. Leonard Jossem – 1994
 Robert Beck Clark – 1995
 Donald F. Holcomb – 1996
 Daniel Kleppner – 1997
 Edwin F. Taylor – 1998
 David L. Goodstein – 1999
 John G. King – 2000
 Lillian C. McDermott – 2001
 David Hestenes – 2002
 Edward W. Kolb – 2003
 Lawrence Krauss – 2004
 Eugene D. Commins – 2005
 Kenneth W. Ford – 2006
 Carl Wieman – 2007
 Mildred S. Dresselhaus – 2008
 George Smoot – 2009
 Not Awarded – 2010
 F. James Rutherford – 2011
 Charles H. Holbrow – 2012
 Edward F. Redish – 2013
 Dean Zollman – 2014
 Karl C. Mamola – 2015 
 John Winston Belcher – 2016
 Jan Tobochnik - 2017
 Barbara L. Whitten - 2018
 Gay Stewart - 2019
 David Sokoloff - 2020

See also

 List of physics awards

References

External links
AAPT site

Physics education
Physics awards
Teacher awards
Awards established in 1936
American education awards